Sylvie O'Dy (11 January 1951 – 21 November 2022) was a French journalist and writer. She was also president of the Comité Contre l'Esclavage Moderne from 1999 to 2005.

Bibliography
L’Etat EDF (1978)
Esclaves en France (2001)

References

1951 births
2022 deaths
French writers
French journalists
People from Chamalières
Officiers of the Légion d'honneur